Massilia umbonata is a bacterium from the genus Massilia which has been isolated from soil and sewage sludge compost in Jaén in Spain.

References

Burkholderiales
Bacteria described in 2014